P&O Irish Sea was the trading name of P&O Ferries in the Irish Sea from 1998 to 2010, when it was rebranded P&O Ferries.

History
The P&O Irish Sea brand was formed in 1998 by merging the ferry operations of Pandoro Ltd (who operated freight-orientated routes between England, Scotland and France to Ireland) into P&O European Ferries (Felixstowe) Ltd.  The merged company was renamed P&O European Ferries (Irish Sea) Ltd and headquartered in the former head office of Pandoro at Copse Road in Fleetwood.  Only the Cairnryan based service of P&O European Ferries (Felixstowe) Ltd transferred to the merged company.

In 1999, P&O Irish Sea announced its intention to purchase two purpose-built Ro-Pax's (roll-on, roll-off, vehicle/passenger) vessels from Mitsubishi of Japan for the Larne - Cairnryan and Liverpool – Dublin routes. This would allow the transfer of the European Leader to the Fleetwood - Larne route and sale of Pride of Rathlin.  The new ships would be European Causeway and European Ambassador and were delivered in 2000 and 2001 respectively.  An additional ship for the Larne - Cairnryan route was ordered in 2000 and delivered in 2002 as European Highlander.

In 2004, P&O sold its Fleetwood – Larne service to Stena Line. In addition to the service rights, European Leader, European Pioneer and European Seafarer were also sold to the Stena Sphere. Originally the company had also intended to sell the Liverpool - Dublin route to Stena, but this was blocked on competition grounds. In 2005, the company withdrew from the Rosslare – Cherbourg route; this was taken over by a new company, Celtic Link Ferries, who also purchased European Diplomat. In 2014 this route was also taken over by Stena Line.

During 2006, P&O's ferry and port operations were taken over by DP World.  In 2010, P&O Irish Sea, which had been run from the parent company's offices in Dover since the withdrawal from Fleetwood in 2004, was rebranded as part of P&O Ferries.  Officially the company name remains as P&O European Ferries (Irish Sea) Ltd, however.  This rebranding coincided with other changes within the P&O Ferries group of companies such as the closure of the Portsmouth - Bilbao route.

Routes
P&O Irish Sea operated many routes across the Irish Sea:

Cairnryan – Larne - conventional ferries (all year round with fast craft service during conventional ferries refit period; in 2013 this was 10 May to 10 June).  P&O Ferries currently operates this route.
Troon – Larne - fast craft service (Spring to Autumn).  This route no longer exists.
Liverpool – Dublin - conventional ferries (all year round).  P&O Ferries currently operates this route.
Fleetwood – Larne (route and ships sold to Stena Line in 2004).  This route no longer exists.
Mostyn – Dublin (2001–2004). This route no longer exists.
Ardrossan – Larne (service changed to Troon - Larne in 2001). This route no longer exists.
Rosslare – Cherbourg (route and ship taken over by Celtic Link Ferries in 2005; now operated by Stena Line)
Dublin – Cherbourg (2001–2004).  This route no longer exists though a new route linking the two ports has since been established by Irish Ferries.

Fleet
P&O Irish Sea operated a large fleet of vessels during its twelve years in operation.

See also
P&O Ferries
P&O Stena Line
P&O Portsmouth

References

External links
P&O Irish Sea Corporate Site
'The Pride of Aisla and the Pride of Rathlin' - Scaled models built for Motis Ireland Ltd.
Larne Ferry Web - for news & history of ferry services to Larne

P&O (company)
Ferry companies of Scotland
Ferry companies of England
Ferry companies of Northern Ireland
Ferry companies of the Republic of Ireland